Estadio La Romareda  is the home stadium of Real Zaragoza, in Zaragoza. It was inaugurated on 8 September 1957, with a game between Real Zaragoza and CA Osasuna (4–3). The official capacity is 33,608, with an average attendance of around 20,000 for Real Zaragoza matches. Currently, it is the 12th-largest stadium in Spain and the largest in Aragon.

The stadium has gone through various upgrades, in 1977 and in 1982, when it was a 1982 FIFA World Cup venue. The stadium was also used for football group matches and a quarterfinal during the 1992 Summer Olympics. It became an all-seater stadium in 1994.
The stadium also hosted the 1992-94 FIRA Trophy match between Spain and Romania in 1994. 
Plans to build a new stadium in Zaragoza have been abandoned.

La Romareda was proposed as the Olympic Stadium in Jaca's failed bid for the 2014 Winter Olympics.

Works for the enlargement of La Romareda into a 43,000-seat stadium were due to begin on April 17, 2006 and end in time for the Zaragoza Expo of 2008. However, a lawsuit was filed by a political party (PAR), claiming that the enlargement of the stadium would be to the detriment of the population, in order to suspend the planned works. A judge ordered the suspension and the works were put on hold.

History
The construction of La Romareda was due to the efforts of the mayor Luis Gómez Laguna, and his successor Cesáreo Alierta, who was the president of Real Zaragoza. Their previous ground Estadio Torrero, with a capacity of 20,000, was considered too small.

The matter was brought before the city council, who on 9 February 1956 approved the plans to build the stadium. The task of building the stadium was given to the construction company Agroman, who in the 15 months it took to build the stadium employed 350 employees.
 
Pop Superstar Michael Jackson performed at the stadium during his HIStory World Tour on September 23 1996 in front of 45,000 of attendance.

Another pop music icon Gloria Estefan performed at the stadium in front of another sold out crowd of 45,000 on her Evolution Tour on October 20, 1996.

Nets
La Romareda boasts the bizarre claim to have Europe's deepest goal nets, which stretch back four metres. The nets also have a striking blue and white diagonal stripe design.

1982 FIFA World Cup
The stadium was one of the venues of the 1982 FIFA World Cup, and held three matches:

References

External links
Estadios de Espana 
1992 Summer Olympics official report. Volume 2. pp. 331–33.

1982 FIFA World Cup stadiums
Football venues in Aragon
Real Zaragoza
Venues of the 1992 Summer Olympics
Rugby union stadiums in Spain
Olympic football venues
Buildings and structures in Zaragoza
Sports venues completed in 1957